Hubert Amyot d'Inville (1 August 1909, in Beauvais, 10 June 1944 in Montefiascone) was a Free French Naval officer best known for commanding the  1er régiment de fusiliers marins detachment during the Battle of Bir Hakeim. He was killed in action on 10 June 1944 by a landmine while driving in his Jeep.

External links
Picture of Amyot, and a history of the 1er Régiment de Fusiliers Marins

1909 births
1944 deaths
People from Beauvais
Military personnel of the Free French Naval Forces
French Navy personnel of World War II
Companions of the Liberation
Recipients of the Resistance Medal
Landmine victims
French military personnel killed in World War II
Officiers of the Légion d'honneur
French Navy officers